Sporting Bengal United Football Club is an English football team from Mile End, in the London Borough of Tower Hamlets.

History
The club was formed in 1996 to encourage Asian football in London. They initially played in the London Intermediate League until they were granted senior status in 2003 by the London Football Association, following a tour to Bangladesh, where they played the Bangladesh national team. In the same year, Sporting Bengal joined the Kent League. In 2005, they were one of the first Asian teams to play in the FA Cup, along with London APSA of the Essex Senior League, whose roots are in the neighbouring borough of Newham.

The Sporting Bengal set-up is unusual in that it is operated by the Bangladesh Football Association (UK) and players are selected from (and retain their affiliation with) the Sunday league clubs which are affiliated to that organisation. In 2011 the club signed up ex Wycombe Wanderers and Wimbledon striker Shahed Ahmed. They were also unusual in being the only Kent League club to play their home matches north of the River Thames, outside the traditional borders of Kent.

In 2010, Sporting Bengal was targeted by the Bangladesh Football Federation for its players to represent the Bangladesh national squad. Sadiq Sarwar and Shahed Ahmed were selected to represent their country at the 2010 South Asian Games.

Records
Best league position: 8th in the Essex Senior League, 2018–19
Best FA Cup performance: First qualifying round, 2016–17
Best FA Vase performance: Third round, 2011–12
Attendance: 4,235 vs Mohammedan Sporting Club

See also
Football in London

References

External links
Club website

Football clubs in England
Association football clubs established in 1996
Sport in the London Borough of Tower Hamlets
Football clubs in London
Southern Counties East Football League
Essex Senior Football League
1996 establishments in England
Diaspora sports clubs in the United Kingdom
Diaspora association football clubs in England